Austrorossia enigmatica is a species of bobtail squid native to the southeastern Atlantic Ocean; it occurs off the coast of southern Africa from Namibia to Cape Province. It lives at depths from 276 to 400 m.

The type specimens measure up to 27 mm in mantle length.

The type locality of this species is off the South African coast.  The type specimens are deposited at The Natural History Museum in London.

The validity of A. enigmatica has been questioned.

References

External links 

Bobtail squid
Molluscs described in 1924